Hygraula nitens, the pond moth or Australian water moth, is a moth of the family Crambidae. It was described by Arthur Gardiner Butler in 1880. It is found in New Zealand and most of Australia, including Tasmania.

The wingspan is about 25 mm.

The caterpillars of this species live underwater. The filaments protruding from the body are not hairs but gills for breathing underwater. The larvae feed on Potamogeton crispus and Zostera species. They also feed on other alien macrophytes such as Hydrilla verticillata, Lagarosiphon major, and Ceratophyllum demersum. The larvae are delicate and build leaf housing.

References 

Acentropinae
Moths of New Zealand
Moths described in 1880